Georgia Williams Allen (May 12, 1919 – January 11, 2014) was an American actress. She was active from 1949 to 2006, beginning in local theater before progressing to both television and movie roles.

Early life
Allen was born in Beaumont, Texas.  She later moved, via Cleveland, Ohio, to Atlanta, Georgia, where she became an educator in the public school system.

She earned her master's degree at the University of California, Santa Barbara.

Acting career
Allen was a repertory player with Atlanta University Summer Theater for thirty years (1949 to 1979). In that time, Allen appeared in a political satire musical called Red, White and Maddox about Atlanta's Governor Lester Maddox. The show premiered in Atlanta and followed with a short run on Broadway. 

Her first screen role was as the mother of Clifton Davis' character, Gus, in Together for Days (1972). After a five-year break, she returned in 1977 as Mrs. Jones in Greased Lightning. She appeared in four television movies between 1979 and 1982, then several more from the mid-1980s onward. Between 1990 and 1994, she appeared as three different characters in the television series In the Heat of the Night. In 1997, she played Lucille Wright, the caterer of the party hosted by Kevin Spacey's character, Jim Williams, in Midnight in the Garden of Good and Evil.

Awards
Allen was awarded the Bronze Jubilee Award by WETV in 1979; the Ray McIver Award by the Just Us Theater in 1993; and the Legacy Award by Jomandi Productions, also in 1993.

Her last-known appearance was as Ruby in Madea's Family Reunion (2006).

Personal life
Allen was educated at Clark College in Atlanta, graduating in 1942. That same year, she married Thaddius S. Allen, with whom she had a daughter and a son during their 67-year marriage.

Death
Allen died on January 11, 2014, having survived her husband by five years. She is interred in Atlanta's Crest Lawn Cemetery.

References

External links

Georgia Williams Allen Works Compilation reel - Vimeo

1919 births
2014 deaths
20th-century American actresses
21st-century American actresses
Schoolteachers from Georgia (U.S. state)
American women educators
American film actresses
American television actresses
Actresses from Ohio
Clark Atlanta University alumni
People from Beaumont, Texas
People from Cleveland